The following article presents a summary of the 1982 football (soccer) season in Brazil, which was the 81st season of competitive football in the country.

Campeonato Brasileiro Série A

Quarterfinals

|}

Semifinals

|}

Final

Flamengo declared as the Campeonato Brasileiro champions by aggregate score of 2-1.

Relegation
The worst placed team in each one of the eight groups in the first stage plus the four clubs eliminated in the qualification/relegation playoff, which are Nacional, River, Ferroviário, Itabaiana, Mixto, Vitória, Taguatinga, Joinville, América (RN), CSA, Goiás and Desportiva, were relegated to the same year's second level.

Campeonato Brasileiro Série B

Quarterfinals

|}

Semifinals

|}

Final

Campo Grande declared as the Campeonato Brasileiro Série B champions by aggregate score of 8-5.

Promotion
The competition champion, which is Campo Grande, was promoted to the following year's first level, and the first placed team in each one of the four groups in the second stage, which were América-RJ, Corinthians, São Paulo-RS and Atlético Paranaense, were promoted to the same season's first level's second stage.

State championship champions

(1)Itabaiana and Sergipe shared the Sergipe State Championship title.

Youth competition champions

Other competition champions

Brazilian clubs in international competitions

Brazil national team
The following table lists all the games played by the Brazil national football team in official competitions and friendly matches during 1982.

References

 Brazilian competitions at RSSSF
 1982 Brazil national team matches at RSSSF

 
Seasons in Brazilian football
Brazil